Johann Anton de Peters (16 January 1725 – 6 October 1795) was a German painter and etcher.

Peters was born at Cologne in 1725, and studied in Paris under Greuze. He was raised to the rank of a noble by the king of France, and appointed court painter by the Danish king, Christian VII, as well as by Prince Charles of Lorraine. The Revolution drove him back to his native country, where he lived in poverty, and died at Cologne in 1795. There are by him:

Paintings

Death of Cleopatra (in miniature upon ivory).
A Girl leaving the Bath (Herr Merlo, Cologne).
The Girl with the Carp.

Etchings
Virgin and Child, in a landscape.
Holy Family on the Flight to Egypt (after Rembrandt).

See also
 List of German painters

References
 
Johann Anton de Peters at the RKD database

1725 births
1795 deaths
18th-century German painters
18th-century German male artists
German male painters
German engravers
Artists from Cologne
Court painters
French untitled nobility